Parkway West High School may refer to:

Parkway West High School (Missouri)
Parkway West High School (Pennsylvania)